, also known by his Chinese style name  or , was a prince of Ryukyu Kingdom.

Chōki was the third son of King Shō Tei. His mother was Makabe Aji-ganashi, the successor consort of King Shō Tei, so he was also a full-brother of Prince Misato Chōtei. Chōki was the originator of royal family Gushichan Udun. He served as sessei from 1705 to 1712. 

Chōki's second son, Misato Chōkō, was adopted by Misato Chōtei, and later became the second head of royal family Ōgimi Udun. Chōki's third son, Makabe Chōei, was adopted by grandmother Makabe Aji-ganashi, and was the originator of royal family Makabe Udun.

References

|-

1676 births
1721 deaths
Princes of Ryūkyū
Sessei
People of the Ryukyu Kingdom
Ryukyuan people
17th-century Ryukyuan people
18th-century Ryukyuan people